Aino is a female given name used in Finland, Estonia, and Japan.

The name Aino, meaning "the only one" in Finnish, was devised by Elias Lönnrot, who compiled, from surviving oral folk sources which he had collected, the Kalevala. In this epic poem, Aino (mythology) is a beautiful girl who seems to wish to drown herself rather than marry the elderly Väinämöinen. She is later on unexpectedly lost in the water while bathing in a strange, unknown lake.  In the original poems, she is mentioned as "the only daughter" (ainoa tyttö).

National romanticism
During the national romantic period in Finland at the end of the 19th century the mythological name Aino was adopted as a Christian name by Fennoman activists. Among the first to be named so were Aino Järnefelt (Aino Sibelius), born 1871 and Aino Krohn (the later Aino Kallas), born 1878.

According to the Finnish Population Register Centre, over 60,000 women have been given the name. It was especially popular in the early 20th century, and the most common first name for women in the 1920s. It has returned to favor in the 21st century; it has been a popular name for girls born in Finland in recent years. Aina is a variant.

Japanese use 
Aino is also a feminine name in use in Japan, with different origins and different meanings depending on the combinations of kanji that are used to spell the name.

Notable people
 Aino Aalto (1894–1949), Finnish architect and designer
 Aino Ackté (1876–1944), Finnish opera singer
 Aino Autio (born 1932), Finnish sprinter
 Aino Bach (1901–1980), Estonian artist 
 Aino Bergö (1915-1944), Swedish ballerina, opera singer and film actress
 Aino Forsten (1885-1937), Finnish politician and educator
 Aino Henssen (1925-2011), German-Finnish lichenologist and systematist
 Aino Hivand (born 1947), Norwegian-Sami visual artist and children's book writer
 Aino Jawo (born 1986), member of Swedish pop duo Icona Pop
 Aino Kalda (1929–2017), Estonian botanist
 Aino Kallas (1878–1956), Finnish-Estonian writer
 Aino Kallio-Ericsson (1917-2018), Finnish architect
 Aino Karppinen (born 1997), Finnish ice hockey player
 Aino Kinjō, (born 1974), Japanese professional ten-pin bowler
 Aino Kishi (born 1988), Japanese actress and AV idol
 Aino Kukk (1930-2006), Estonian chess player
 Aino Kuusinen (1886–1970), Finnish communist
 Aino Lehtokoski (1886-1949), Finnish politician
 Aino Lepik von Wirén (born 1961), Estonian diplomat
 Aino Lohikoski (1898-1981), Finnish actress
 Aino-Eevi Lukas (1930–2019), Estonian equestrian, lawyer and politician
 Aino-Maija Luukkonen (born 1958), Finnish politician
 Aino Malkamäki (1894-1961), Finnish teacher and politician
 Aino Malmberg (1865–1933), Finnish writer and politician
 Aino Mantsas (1922-1979), Finnish actress
 Aino Nykopp-Koski (born 1950), Finnish serial killer
 Aino-Kaisa Pekonen (born 1979), Finnish politician
 Aino Pervik (born 1932), Estonian children's writer
 Aino Puronen (born 1936), former Soviet racing cyclist
 Aino Kann Rasmussen (born 1937), Danish archaeologist
 Aino Runge (1926–2014), Estonian economist, consumer defender and politician
 Aino-Kaisa Saarinen (born 1979), Finnish cross country skier
 Aino Seep (1925–1982), Estonian singer and actress
 Aino Sibelius (1871–1969), wife of composer Jean Sibelius
 Aino Talvi (1909-1992), Estonian actress
 Aino Tamm (1864–1945), Estonian singer and vocal pedagogue
 Aino Taube (1912-1990), Swedish film and theatre actress
 Aino-Maija Tikkanen (born 1927), Finnish film actress

Notes

Finnish feminine given names
Estonian feminine given names
Japanese feminine given names